Frederick Charles Arnold Tully (4 July 1907 – 1969) was an English footballer who played as a winger for Southampton and Clapton Orient in the 1930s.

Southampton
According to Holley & Chalk's Alphabet of the Saints he was "a winger of thrust and enterprise" who was a "busy sort of player who could play anywhere in the forward line except centre-forward". He made his debut on 26 August 1933 in the opening match of the 1933–34 season against Bradford City, before injury forced him to miss several months (with Bill Luckett standing in at outside-left).

References

External links
Aston Villa profile at Aston Villa Player Database

1907 births
1969 deaths
Footballers from St Pancras, London
English footballers
Aston Villa F.C. players
Southampton F.C. players
Leyton Orient F.C. players
Association football wingers